In sociology, codependency is a theory that attempts to explain imbalanced relationships where one person enables another person's self-destructive behavior such as addiction, poor mental health, immaturity, irresponsibility, or under-achievement.

Definitions of codependency vary, but typically include high self-sacrifice, a focus on others' needs, suppression of one's own emotions, and attempts to control or fix other people's problems. People who self-identify as codependent exhibit low self-esteem, but it is unclear whether this is a cause or an effect of characteristics associated with codependency. Codependency is not limited to married, partnered, or romantic relationships, as co-workers, friends, and family members can be codependent as well.

History

The term “codependency” most likely developed in Minnesota in the late 1970s from “co-alcoholic”, when alcoholism and other drug dependencies were grouped together as “chemical dependency.” The term is most often identified with Alcoholics Anonymous and the realization that the alcoholism was not solely about the addict but also about the family and friends who constitute a network for the alcoholic.

The term “codependent” was first used to describe how family members and friends might interfere with the recovery of a person affected by a substance use disorder by "overhelping". Application of the concept of codependency was driven by the self-help community.

In 1986, Psychiatrist Timmen Cermak wrote Diagnosing and Treating Co-Dependence: A Guide for Professionals. In that book and an article published in the Journal of Psychoactive Drugs, Cermak argued unsuccessfully for the inclusion of codependency as a separate personality disorder in the Diagnostic and Statistical Manual of Mental Disorders, DSM-III-R. He found that the condition could affect people close to people with any mental disorder, not just addiction.

Melody Beattie popularized the concept of codependency in 1986 with the book Codependent No More which sold eight million copies, with updated editions released in 1992 and 2022. Drawing on her personal experience with substance abuse and caring for someone with it, she also interviewed people helped by Al-Anon. Beattie's work formed the underpinning of a twelve-step organisation called Co-Dependents Anonymous, founded in 1986, although the group does not endorse any definition of or diagnostic criteria for codependency.

Definition
Codependency has no established definition or diagnostic criteria within the mental health community. It has not been included as a condition in any edition of the DSM or ICD.

Codependency carries three potential levels of meaning. First, it can describe a didactic tool that, once explained to families, helps them normalize the feelings that they are experiencing and allows them to shift their focus from the dependent person to their own dysfunctional behavior patterns.  Second, it can describe a psychological concept, a shorthand means of describing and explaining human behavior. Third, it can describe a psychological disorder, implying that there is a consistent pattern of traits or behaviors across individuals that can create significant dysfunction.

Discussion of codependency tends to focus on the disease model of the term, although there is no agreement that codependency is a disorder at all, or how such a disease entity might be defined or diagnosed. In an early attempt to define codependency as a diagnosable disorder, Timmen Cermak wrote, "Co-dependence is a recognisable pattern of personality traits, predictably found within most members of chemically dependent families, which are capable of creating sufficient dysfunction to warrant the diagnosis of Mixed Personality Disorder as outlined in DSM III." Timmen proceeded to list the traits he identified in self-suppressing supporting partners of people with chemical dependence or disordered personalities, and to provide a DSM-style set of diagnostic criteria.

In her self-help book, Melody Beattie proposes that, "The obvious definition [of codependency] would be: being a partner in dependency. This definition is close to the truth but still unclear." Beattie elaborates, "A codependent person is one who has let another person's behaviour affect him or her, and who is obsessed with controlling that person's behaviour." Another self-help author, Darlene Lancer, asserts that "A codependent is a person who can’t function from his or her innate self and instead organizes thinking and behavior around a substance, process, or other person(s)." Lancer includes all addicts in her definition. She believes a "lost self" is the core of codependency.

Co-Dependents Anonymous, a self-help organization for people who seek to develop healthy and functional relationships, "offer[s] no definition or diagnostic criteria for codependence", but provides a list of "patterns and characteristics of codependence" that can be used by laypeople for self-evaluation. The organization identifies patterns that may occur in codependency.

The Medical Subject Heading utilized by the United States National Library of Medicine describes codependency as "A relational pattern in which a person attempts to derive a sense of purpose through relationships with others."

Theories

Under theories of codependency as a psychological disorder, the codependent partner in a relationship is often described as displaying self-perception, attitudes and behaviors that serve to increase problems within the relationship instead of decreasing them. It is often suggested that people who are codependent were raised in dysfunctional families or with early exposure to addiction behavior, resulting in their allowance of similar patterns of behavior by their partner.

Relationships
Codependent relationships are often described as being marked by intimacy problems, dependency, control (including caretaking), denial, dysfunctional communication and boundaries, and high reactivity. There may be imbalance within the relationship, where one person is abusive or in control or supports or enables another person's addiction, poor mental health, immaturity, irresponsibility, or under-achievement.

Under this conception of codependency, the codependent person's sense of purpose within a relationship is based on making extreme sacrifices to satisfy their partner's needs. Codependent relationships signify a degree of unhealthy "clinginess" and needy behavior, where one person does not have self-sufficiency or autonomy. One or both parties depend on their loved one for fulfillment.

Personality disorders
Codependency may occur within the context of relationships with people with diagnosable personality disorders.

Borderline personality disorder – there is a tendency for loved ones of people with borderline personality disorder (BPD) to slip into "caretaker" roles, giving priority and focus to problems in the life of the person with BPD rather than to issues in their own lives. The codependent partner may gain a sense of worth by being perceived as "the sane one" or "the responsible one".
Narcissistic personality disorder – Narcissists, with their ability to get others to "buy into their vision" and help them make it a reality, seek and attract partners who will put others' needs before their own. A codependent person can provide the narcissist with an obedient and attentive audience. Among the reciprocally interlocking interactions of the pair are the narcissist's overpowering need to feel important and special and the codependent person's strong need to help others feel that way.

Family dynamics
In the dysfunctional family the child learns to become attuned to the parent's needs and feelings instead of the other way around. Parenting is a role that requires a certain amount of self-sacrifice and giving a child's needs a high priority. A parent can be codependent toward their own child. Generally, a parent who takes care of their own needs (emotional and physical) in a healthy way will be a better caretaker, whereas a codependent parent may be less effective, or may even do harm to a child. Codependent relationships often manifest through enabling behaviors, especially between parents and their children. Another way to look at it is that the needs of an infant are necessary but temporary, whereas the needs of the codependent are constant. Children of codependent parents who ignore or negate their own feelings may become codependent.

Recovery and prognosis
With no consensus as to how codependency should be defined, and with no recognized diagnostic criteria, mental health professionals hold a range of opinions about the diagnosis and treatment of codependency. Caring for an individual with a physical addiction is not necessarily treating a pathology. The caregiver may only require assertiveness skills and the ability to place responsibility for the addiction on the other. There are various recovery paths for individuals who struggle with codependency. For example, some may choose cognitive-behavioral psychotherapy, sometimes accompanied by chemical therapy for accompanying depression. There also exist support groups for codependency, such as Co-Dependents Anonymous (CoDA), Al-Anon/Alateen, Nar-Anon, and Adult Children of Alcoholics (ACoA), which are based on the twelve-step program model of Alcoholics Anonymous, Celebrate Recovery and Life Recovery a Christian 12 step Bible-based group. Many self-help guides have been written on the subject of codependency.

It has been proposed that, in attempts to recover from codependency, people may go from being overly passive or overly giving to being overly aggressive or excessively selfish. Therapists may seek to help a client develop a balance through healthy assertiveness, which leaves room for being a caring person and also engaging in healthy caring behavior, while minimizing selfishness, bully, or behaviors that might reflect conflict addiction. Developing a permanent stance of being a victim (having a victim mentality) does not constitute recovery from codependency. A victim mentality could also be seen as a part of one's original state of codependency (lack of empowerment causing one to feel like the "subject" of events rather than being an empowered actor). Someone truly recovered from codependency would feel empowered and like an author of their life and actions rather than being at the mercy of outside forces. A victim mentality may also occur in combination with passive–aggressive control issues. From the perspective of moving beyond victim-hood, the capacity to forgive and let go (with exception of cases of very severe abuse) could also be signs of real recovery from codependency, but the willingness to endure further abuse would not.

It is theorized that unresolved patterns of codependency may lead to more serious problems like alcoholism, drug addiction, eating disorders, sex addiction, psychosomatic illnesses, and other self-destructive or self-defeating behaviors. People with codependency may be more likely to attract further abuse from aggressive individuals (such as those with BPD or NPD), more likely to stay in stressful jobs or relationships, less likely to seek medical attention when needed and are also less likely to get promotions and tend to earn less money than those without codependency patterns. For some people, the social insecurity caused by codependency may progress into full-blown social anxiety disorders like social phobia, avoidant personality disorder or painful shyness. Other stress-related disorders like panic disorder, depression or PTSD may also be present.

Controversy
Codependency is not a diagnosable mental health condition, there is no medical consensus as to its definition, and there is no evidence that codependency is caused by a disease process. Without clinical definition, the term is easily applicable to many behaviors and has been overused by some self-help authors and support communities. In an article in Psychology Today, clinician Kristi Pikiewicz suggested that the term codependency has been overused to the point of becoming a cliché, and labeling a patient as codependent can shift the focus on how their traumas shaped their current relationships.

Some scholars and treatment providers assert that codependency should be understood as a positive impulse gone awry, and challenge the idea that interpersonal behaviors should be conceptualized as addictions or diseases, as well as the pathologizing of personality characteristics associated with women. A study of the characteristics associated with codependency found that non-codependency was associated with masculine character traits, while codependency was associated with negative feminine traits, such as being self-denying, self-sacrificing,
or displaying low self-esteem.

See also

References

Further reading
 Cermak M.D, Timmen L., Diagnosing and Treating Co-Dependence: A Guide for Professionals Who Work with Chemical Dependents, Their Spouses, and Children (Professional Series), 1998, Hazelden Publishing, Minnesota, 
 CoDA, Co-Dependents Anonymous, 1997, CoDA Resource Publishing, Phoenix, 
 Beattie, Melody Codependent No More: How to Stop Controlling Others and Start Caring for Yourself, 1986, Hazelden, Minnesota, 
 Whitfield M.D., Charles L.,Healing The Child Within: Discovery and Recovery for Adult Children of Dysfunctional Families, 1987, Health Communications, Inc., Florida, 
 Lancer, Darlene, Conquering Shame and Codependency: 8 Steps to Freeing the True You, 2014, Hazelden, Minnesota,

External links

 
 
 

Behavioural syndromes associated with physiological disturbances and physical factors
Codependency
Interpersonal relationships
Narcissism
Borderline personality disorder
Duos